Sclerocactus whipplei, or Whipple's fishhook cactus, is a cactus (family Cactaceae) found in the Colorado Plateau and Canyonlands region of the southwestern United States.

The cactus was named in honor of Lieut. Amiel Weeks Whipple (1818-1863) the military engineer/surveyor, who led boundary survey team that identified the cactus specimen.

References

whipplei